Cidade Alta is a settlement in Cantagalo District, São Tomé Island in the nation of São Tomé and Príncipe. Its population is 212 (2012 census). It lies directly northwest of Santana.

Population history

References

Populated places in Cantagalo District